Haslington is a civil parish in Cheshire East, England. It contains 12 buildings that are recorded in the National Heritage List for England as designated listed buildings.  Of these, one is listed at Grade I, the highest grade, and the others are at Grade II.  The parish contains the villages of Haslington, Oakhanger and Winterley, but is otherwise rural.  The listed buildings consist of two churches, two former manor houses, a former vicarage with its lodge, other houses and cottages, and a public house.

Key

Buildings

See also

Listed buildings in Alsager
Listed buildings in Barthomley
Listed buildings in Crewe
Listed buildings in Crewe Green
Listed buildings in Hassall
Listed buildings in Moston
Listed buildings in Sandbach

References
Citations

Sources

 

 

 

Listed buildings in the Borough of Cheshire East
Lists of listed buildings in Cheshire